Lovers rock is a style of reggae music.

Lovers Rock may also refer to:

Lovers Rock (2020 film), directed by Steve McQueen from the anthology series Small Axe
Lovers' Rock (1964 film), Taiwanese film
Lovers Rock (Sade album), 2000
Lovers Rock (Estelle album), 2018
Lovers Rock (The Dears album), 2020
"Lover's Rock", a song by The Clash, appearing on their 1979 album London Calling
"Lovers Rock", a song by TV Girl from their 2014 album French Exit

See also
Lovers' Stone, a rock formation near Bowen Road in Hong Kong